Patrick McHugh (born 23 January 1953) is a former Irish politician. He was an Independent Teachta Dála (TD) for the Galway East constituency. McHugh was elected to Dáil Éireann at the 2002 general election, getting a 15.8% share of the vote. He was a member of the Technical group established to ensure Dáil speaking time for independent TDs. He lost his seat at the 2007 general election, getting a 5.8% share of the vote.	

McHugh was first elected to Galway County Council in 1985. He was also elected to Tuam Town Council in 1999. In 2001, he left the Fianna Fáil party and became an independent. He served as a County Councillor until the abolition of the dual mandate in 2004.

References

 

1953 births
Living people
Independent TDs
Fianna Fáil politicians
Local councillors in County Galway
Members of the 29th Dáil
People from Tuam
Politicians from County Galway